Turn Up the Quiet is the thirteenth studio album by Canadian singer Diana Krall, released on May 5, 2017, by Verve Records.

Background
The album consists of 11 jazz standards. The Japanese edition of the album includes "How Deep Is the Ocean" as a bonus track. Krall explained: "I have thought about these songs for a long time. Being in the company of some of my greatest friends in music allowed me to tell these stories just as I'd intended. Sometimes you just have to turn up the quiet to be heard a little better." Alan Broadbent conducts three tracks on the album that reunites Krall with Christian McBride and Russell Malone for some compositions along with drummer Jeff Hamilton and bass player John Clayton Jr., the latter credited together with Krall on her 2005 album Christmas Songs. Turn Up the Quiet also marks her last album with her longtime producer and friend Tommy LiPuma, who died in March 2017. LiPuma first worked with Krall on her second studio album, Only Trust Your Heart (1995).

Tour
In support of the album, Krall embarked on the Turn Up the Quiet World Tour, which began on June 2, 2017, in Minneapolis and concluded on November 4, 2018, in Costa Mesa, California.

Critical reception

At Metacritic, which assigns a normalized rating out of 100 to reviews from mainstream critics, the album received an average score of 71, based on four reviews, which indicates "generally favorable reviews". At AnyDecentMusic?, which collects critical reviews from more than 50 media sources, the album scored 6.7 points out of 10, based on five reviews.

Christopher Loudon of Jazz Times stated, "Playing and singing on all tracks and reunited with co-producer Tommy LiPuma, who died weeks before the project's release, Diana Krall is in the mellowest of moods. She rarely raises her voice above a whisper, her self-accompaniment equally restrained. Even tunes typically handled with plenty of zest and verve—'Blue Skies,' 'L-O-V-E,' 'Sway'—are winningly tempered. Vocally she's grown a shade duskier, a degree or two grainier and, in the process, more enticing, more alluring." Maertin Townsend of the Daily Express called the album a "spacious, unhurried gem of a record".

Bobby Reed of DownBeat wrote, "For this album, Krall selected the songs, wrote the ensemble arrangements and oversaw three different ensemble lineups. At this point in her career, Krall knows how to put her own distinctive stamp on decades-old standards, making them sound fresh and vibrant, while still honoring the melodies that Great American Songbook fans know so well." Jim Hynes of Elmore Magazine commented "Put your headphones on at night and listen to the finesse and nuance of Krall here in the quiet. You can't help but be impressed".

Clint Rhodes of The Herald-Standard commented, "The talented singer's style is perfect for creating an intimate mood for a quiet dinner for two or a casual gathering of a few close friends. Rotating recording performances between a trio, quartet and quintet, the arrangements possess a sense of improvisation that evokes a live vibe throughout the set... Next time you feel the pressures of the day starting to build, take some time to escape to your patio, back porch, comfortable easy chair or special secluded place and lose yourself in the welcoming oasis created by Krall. The quiet has never sounded so good."

Track listing

Personnel
Credits adapted from the liner notes of Turn Up the Quiet.

Studios
 Capitol Studios (Hollywood, California) – recording, mixing
 Germano Studios (New York City) – additional engineering 
 The Bakery (Culver City, California) – mastering

Musicians

 Diana Krall – piano, vocals, ensemble arrangements
 Christian McBride – bass 
 Russell Malone – guitar 
 John Clayton Jr. – bass 
 Jeff Hamilton – drums 
 Anthony Wilson – guitar 
 Stefon Harris – vibraphone 
 Joel Derouin – concertmaster 
 Charlie Bisharat, Mario DeLeon, Kevin Connolly, Neel Hammond, Tamara Hatwan, Natalie Leggett, Songa Lee, Katia Popov, Michele Richards, Kathleen Sloan, Marcy Vaj, Ina Veli, John Wittenberg – violins 
 Andrew Duckles, Kathryn Reddish, Colleen Sugata, Michael Whitson – violas 
 Jodi Burnett, Alisha Bauer, Jeniffer Kuhn – celli 
 Vanessa Freebairn-Smith – cello ; cello solo 
 Alan Broadbent – orchestration, orchestral arrangements, conducting 
 Tony Garnier – bass 
 Karriem Riggins – drums 
 Marc Ribot – guitar 
 Stuart Duncan – fiddle

Technical

 Tommy LiPuma – production
 Diana Krall – production
 Al Schmitt – recording, mixing
 Shari Sutcliffe – contractor, production coordination
 Steve Genewick – engineering assistance, Pro Tools editing
 Brian Montgomery – additional engineering 
 Chandler Harrod – engineering assistance
 Jason Staniulis – engineering assistance
 Chie Imaizumi – copyist
 Terry Woodson – copyist
 Neema Pazargad – piano tuning
 Oleg Schramm – piano tuning
 Eric Boulanger – mastering

Artwork
 Josh Cheuse – creative direction
 Coco Shinomiya – design
 Edwin Fotheringham – label illustration
 Mary McCartney – photography

Charts

Weekly charts

Year-end charts

References

2017 albums
Albums recorded at Capitol Studios
Diana Krall albums
Juno Award for Vocal Jazz Album of the Year albums
Verve Records albums